Mosa Zi Zemmori is a Belgian citizen who was held in extrajudicial detention in the United States Guantanamo Bay detainment camps, in Cuba.
His Guantanamo detainee ID number was 270. The Department of Defense reports that his date of birth is July 3, 1978, in Wilrijk, Belgium.
He was repatriated to Belgium on April 25, 2005.
When he was arrested he was characterized as a Moroccan, or a Belgian, from Morocco, although the DoD says he was born in Belgium.

Life

Press reports routinely assert Zemmori was detained while in Kandahar, in the south of Afghanistan.
But the official DoD allegations against Zemmori acknowledge he was detained in Pakistan, after turning himself in to Pakistani officials.
Those documents say he was transferred to a detention facility in Kandahar.

Administrative Review Board 

Detainees whose Combatant Status Review Tribunal labeled them "enemy combatants" were scheduled for annual Administrative Review Board hearings.  These hearings were designed to assess the threat a detainee might pose if released or transferred, and whether there were other factors that warranted his continued detention.

Repatriation
Zemmori was repatriated to Belgium on April 25, 2005 along with Mesut Sen.

Reuters reports he was held, for a time, by Belgian authorities.

July 2015 arrest

Police in Belgium reported that in July 2015, five men were arrested accused of conspiracy in an armed robbery that was intended to raise funds to support recruitment of fighters in Syria, the five included Zemmori and a second former Guantanamo prisoner.
The arrests occurred on July 22, 2015, but were not reported in the English-speaking press until July 24. The Guardian and Reuters both described Zemmori as a "37-year-old Belgian of Moroccan origin". CNN described him as "a Moroccan national born in Antwerp.".

In May 2009, Zemmori and the other former Guantanamo prisoner were both cleared of the criminal conspiracy charges.

Open letter to President Biden

On January 29, 2021 the New York Review of Books published an open letter from Zemmori, and six other individuals who were formerly held in Guantanamo, to newly inaugurated President Biden, appealing to him to close the detention camp.

See also
 Seton Hall reports

References

Belgian extrajudicial prisoners of the United States
Belgian Muslims
Living people
1978 births
People from Wilrijk
Guantanamo detainees known to have been released